Michael Ross Perkins is a songwriter and recording artist from Dayton, Ohio.

History

Early years

Perkins grew up in Fairborn, Ohio, a suburb of Dayton. During his earliest years, his family lived on Titus Avenue in Dayton's Northridge neighborhood, a few houses from Guided By Voices frontman Robert Pollard. Perkins has stated that his proximity and early exposure to Guided By Voices was influential, noting that Pollard's lo-fi production technique and uninhibited vocal approach gave him the confidence to "make weird sounds" with his voice.  Perkins was also influenced at a young age by The Beatles, particularly the album Magical Mystery Tour, as well as singers Van Morrison, Roy Orbison, and Patsy Cline. In 2002, Perkins began experimenting with a Tascam Portastudio 4-track cassette recorder and amassed a catalog of original songs. He later referred to this formative material as "garbage," citing the negative influence of Top 40 radio on his writing.

2007-2014

In 2007, Perkins' early psychedelic material was discovered by MGMT, who later offered him a touring support slot at the time of their debut release, Oracular Spectacular, on Columbia Records. However, Perkins declined due to anxiety. Later that year, he produced a full-length record under the pseudonym of The Esther Caulfield Orchestra. This album, called Good Morning, Whiskey Breakfast, included contributions from Joseph Sebaali and Andrew Gabbard of Buffalo Killers and was described as a "potent cocktail of thrilling, 60s-inspired psychedelia." Good Morning, Whiskey Breakfast was made available through Perkins' website as a free download, with only 25 hand-made copies of the album on CD made available for purchase. During this time, Perkins worked as a roadie for Buffalo Killers on their tours in support of The Black Crowes, and he has referred to this experience as his "formal introduction to the music industry."

In 2011, all three members of Buffalo Killers acted as Perkins' backing band for a period of time before he retired his Esther Caulfield Orchestra moniker in order to form his new group, called Goodbye. For this new project, Perkins recruited the members of West, a group fronted by Kelley Deal of The Breeders. After Deal put the group on hiatus in anticipation of The Breeders' 2012 reunion tour, drummer Ian Kaplan, guitarist Nick Eddy, and bassist Chris Green began rehearsing and performing with Perkins as Goodbye. Goodbye produced a full-length record, entitled Cheerio!, however Perkins reportedly spent over 5 years revising the album before ultimately deciding that it would not be released.

2014-2019

After the death of Chris Green in 2014, Perkins disbanded Goodbye and began working on new solo material at his home in Dayton's Belmont neighborhood. These new songs would form the basis for Perkins' first official release. SofaBurn Records approached Perkins with a recording contract in 2015 after Zach Gabbard presented the company with a collection of material by The Esther Caulfield Orchestra and Goodbye. In January 2016, Perkins recorded the drum tracks for the forthcoming SofaBurn release at Gabbard's analog studio, Howler Hills Farm. The remainder of the album's instrumentation was completed by Perkins at his home studio.

Perkins' debut release was announced after the song "Humboldt County Green" premiered in High Times in July 2016. The album, called M Ross Perkins, was released by SofaBurn on October 14, 2016. Initial critical reception of the record was enthusiastic, with Record Collector calling it "a truly great album" and others drawing notable stylistic comparisons to solo artists such as Harry Nilsson and Emitt Rhodes.

After touring in support of the debut record, Perkins produced a follow-up EP entitled What Did You Do For Summer Break. SofaBurn released the album in streaming format on August 31, 2018. Critics noted a shift to "a more sophisticated and precise," pop-oriented writing style throughout the EP. Brooklyn music critic Jack Rabid, publisher of The Big Takeover, described the album as "dreamy" and dubbed Perkins the "Brian Wilson to Pollard's Pete Townshend." While promoting the EP, Perkins performed the song "Amazing Grace (Grandma's Dead)" on the Jerry Springer Podcast, with Springer and producer Jene Galvin calling it the best song ever performed on the show.

2019-Present

In 2019, Perkins announced the release of "Gabbard & Perkins," a full length collaboration album with Andrew Gabbard of Buffalo Killers, after the duo premiered the song "Donuts at Bill's" in Shindig. Shortly thereafter, both Perkins and Andrew Gabbard were signed to Colemine Records, and the "Gabbard & Perkins" album has not been released to date.

In 2022, Colemine/Karma Chief released Perkins' second full-length album, "E Pluribus M Ross." The album was recorded between May and June 2020, with Perkins again recording all of the album's instrumentation himself in his home studio. The album was released to critical acclaim, with American Songwriter deeming it "an impressive and often extraordinary work," and Uncut calling it "a record full of harmonic joy."

Trivia

Perkins is sponsored by Höfner Guitars and plays a rare 1967 Höfner model 4578 signed by Sérgio Dias of Os Mutantes.

Discography
 M Ross Perkins (2016)
 What Did You Do for Summer Break (2018)
 E Pluribus M Ross (2022)

Notes

External links
Official Website
Colemine Records Official Website
SofaBurn Records Official Website

Neo-psychedelia
Living people
Musicians from Dayton, Ohio
People from Fairborn, Ohio
21st-century American singers
Year of birth missing (living people)
Singer-songwriters from Ohio